Talavata is a village in the southern state of Karnataka, India. It is located in the border of Shimoga district and Uttara Kannada District. Its taluk is Sagara, Karnataka.

Climate 
As it is in malenadu, it is surrounded by evergreen forest and hills. Average ambient temperature on summer days (March to May) would be 22 °C to 28 °C. Most of the rain fall occurs from June to September. On winters (October to February), temperature falls up to 16 °C.

Occupation 
This place relies on the agricultural products. Primarily, Areca, Paddy (unmilled rice) and Sugar cane are grown. This place is well suited for plantations and farming. People grow Black Pepper, Coffee and other spices as well.

Travel 
This place is well connected by both railway and road transport system. It is adjacent to NH 206. The nearest railway station is Talaguppa. This place also hosts a few homestay for travellers. Some of the homestays in Talavata are AjjanaMane and Matthuga.

Nearest Attractions 
Sri Mahaganapathi Temple, Bacchagaru is the main temple and regional centre of Talavata. The nearest tourist attraction would be famous water fall, Jog Falls and river Sharavathi. Apart these, this place is near to Nipli Falls, Kallu Sankha (Stone Bridge) and View Point and Honnemaradu.

See also
 Jog Falls
 Shimoga
 Districts of Karnataka

References

External links
 http://Shimoga.nic.in/

Villages in Shimoga district